The Wig (German: Die Perücke) is a 1925 German silent comedy film directed by Berthold Viertel and starring Otto Gebühr, Jenny Hasselqvist and Henry Stuart.

The film's sets were designed by the art director Walter Reimann.

Cast
 Otto Gebühr as Querulin und Fürst 
 Jenny Hasselqvist as Fürstin 
 Henry Stuart as Julian 
 Karl Platen as Der alte Diener 
 Fred Goebel as Der junge Dichter 
 Jaro Fürth as Nervenarzt 
 Lilian Jaernefelt as Zofe

References

Bibliography
 Grange, William. Cultural Chronicle of the Weimar Republic. Scarecrow Press, 2008.

External links

1925 films
1925 comedy films
German comedy films
Films of the Weimar Republic
Films directed by Berthold Viertel
German silent feature films
German black-and-white films
Silent comedy films
1920s German films